Mirella Papaeconomou, born in Athens, is a Greek screenwriter for TV series.  She has studied English literature and set and costume design in London, as well as set and costume design and advertising in Vacalo Arts and Design College, in Athens. She has worked for the theatre as production designer. Her first screenplay was written in 1984. Since 1984 she has written many screenplays for TV series that have become great hits. She has won two "Prosopa" Greek Television Awards for the series Logo Timis and I Zoi pou Den Ezisa.

Works

References

External links

Greek screenwriters
Living people
Mass media people from Athens
Year of birth missing (living people)